Nélson Gil de Almeida Gomes (born 2 December 1972), known as Gil, is a Portuguese former footballer who played as a forward.

Football career
Born in Luanda, Portuguese Angola, Gil moved to Portugal at a young age, joining S.L. Benfica's youth system at the age of 14. He excelled at the 1991 FIFA World Youth Championship with the Portuguese under-20 team, scoring one goal in five matches as the tournament ended in victory. At senior level, however, his Primeira Liga input consisted of 30 games over two seasons, not being able to find the net with S.C. Braga and C.F. Estrela da Amadora.

After leaving his adopted nation in 1995 and until his retirement ten years later – he had already had an abroad spell with Tours FC in France – Gil played all but exclusively in lower league and amateur football. In his last six seasons he competed in England, representing Welwitchia, Hendon, Middlewich Town, Salford City, Hyde United and New East Manchester.

Personal life
Gil's son, Angel Gomes, was born in England while his father was playing there, and represented both Manchester United and England at youth level.

Honours
Portugal
UEFA European Under-16 Championship: 1989
FIFA World Youth Championship: 1991

References

External links

1972 births
Living people
Portuguese sportspeople of Angolan descent
Angolan emigrants to Portugal
Footballers from Luanda
Portuguese footballers
Association football forwards
Primeira Liga players
Liga Portugal 2 players
A.D. Ovarense players
S.C. Braga players
C.F. Estrela da Amadora players
Ligue 2 players
Tours FC players
Swiss Challenge League players
Yverdon-Sport FC players
FC Wil players
Serie C players
U.S. Avellino 1912 players
Hendon F.C. players
Middlewich Town F.C. players
Salford City F.C. players
Hyde United F.C. players
Portugal youth international footballers
Portugal under-21 international footballers
Portuguese expatriate footballers
Expatriate footballers in France
Expatriate footballers in Switzerland
Expatriate soccer players in the United States
Expatriate footballers in Italy
Expatriate footballers in England
Portuguese expatriate sportspeople in France
Portuguese expatriate sportspeople in Switzerland
Portuguese expatriate sportspeople in the United States
Portuguese expatriate sportspeople in Italy
Portuguese expatriate sportspeople in England
Association football coaches